Drowning is death by suffocation caused by a liquid that enters the lungs.

Drowning may also refer to:

Music

Albums 
 Drowning EP or the title song, by Lahannya, 2000
 II—Drowning, by Plasma Pool, 1997

Songs 
 "Drowning" (Armin van Buuren song), 2011
 "Drowning" (Backstreet Boys song), 2001
 "Drowning" (Banks song), 2014
 "Drowning" (The Beat song), 1981
 "Drowning" (A Boogie wit da Hoodie song), 2017
 "Drowning" (Chris Young song), 2019
 "Drowning" (Crazy Town song), 2002
 "Drowning" (Hootie & the Blowfish song), 1995
 "Drowning" (Mario song), 2018
 "Drowning (Face Down)", by Saving Abel, 2009
 "Drowning", by Adema from Adema, 2001
 "Drowning", by Arca from Sheep
 "Drowning", by Jay Brannan from In Living Cover, 2009
 "Drowning", by John Entwistle from Mad Dog, 1975
 "Drowning", by Richard Wright from Broken China, 1996
 "Drowning", by Screaming Jets from World Gone Crazy, 1997
 "Drowning", by Six Feet Under from Alive and Dead, 1996
 "Drowning", by Stabbing Westward from Darkest Days, 1998
 "Drowning", by Stereophonics from Pull the Pin, 2007
 "A Drowning", by How to Destroy Angels from How to Destroy Angels, 2010

Other uses 
 Drowning (film), a 2020 American film by Melora Walters
 Drowning (play), a 1987 play by María Irene Fornés
 Drowning Fork, a stream in Illinois, US

See also 
 
 
 The Drowning (disambiguation)
 Drown (disambiguation)
 "Drowned" (song), by the Who
 "Drowned", by Candlebox from Lucy